Büşra Ün (born 19 May 1994) is a Turkish female Paralympic wheelchair tennis player.

Early years
Büşra Ün was born in Izmir. At the age of six-and-half-months, her parents noticed that she has no feeling at her feet. She was diagnosed with neuroblastoma having a malignant tumor in her right abdomen. After one-and-half-year-long chemotherapy and two surgeries, the tumor was removed. However, due to damaged nerves, she became paraplegic.

Currently, she is a student of sport management at Ege University in Izmir.

Playing career
She began with table tennis playing, and then switched over to wheelchair tennis in February 2009 as she was studying in the high school's fourth grade in Buca. She plays right handed.

She is Turkish champion in the women's and junior's category. In 2010, she won the Balkan Championship. She is on the third place in the world's under-18 ranking. In the world's list, she climbed up to the 30th place.

Ün obtained a quota spot at the 2016 Summer Paralympics. She is so the first ever Turkish wheelchair tennis player to represent her country at the Paralympics.

References

Living people
1994 births
Sportspeople from İzmir
Turkish female tennis players
Turkish wheelchair tennis players
Ege University alumni
People with paraplegia
Paralympic wheelchair tennis players of Turkey
Wheelchair tennis players at the 2016 Summer Paralympics
20th-century Turkish sportswomen
21st-century Turkish sportswomen